is Japanese Karate instructor residing in Brazil. He is a member of the IKO1 (Kyokushin Matsui Group)'s international committee and is the General Manager of the South American Regional Federation. He holds a rank of 8th Dan Black in Kyokushin Karate.

Seiji Isobe, although unsuccessful in Full-Contact Karate competitions himself, became renowned as one of the best Kyokushin and/or Full-Contact Karate coaches. He is known for training various highly prestigious Brazilian Karateka, including Francisco Filho, Glaube Feitosa, Ewerton Teixeira, Andrews Nakahara and Ademir da Costa.

Biography
Seiji Isobe was born March 1, 1948, at Fukui City, Fukui Prefecture, Japan. He began traditional karate with Shōtōkan in 1961. He would quit Shotokan in 1963, losing confidence in the style after the head teacher of the dojo got beaten in a physical altercation.

One day, Isobe became interested in Kyokushin Karate, after reading the book "100 Man-ri no karate"  written by Kyokushin Karate founder Mas Oyama. Isobe would temporarily participate in the practice of Kyokushin Kaikan at the headquarters dojo in Tokyo in 1968. Later, he moved to Tokyo in 1970 to practice in earnest. It is said that when he started, he was receiving guidance while respecting and admiring Terutomo Yamazaki and Yasuhiko Oyama. Other seniors and friends at the same time were Miyuki Miura and Katsuaki Sato.

On September 20, 1972, he established a Kyokushin Dojo in Fukui. Mas Ōyama would notice his managerial abilities, and offered Isobe the mission of promoting and setting up a dojo network in South America. That same year, Seiji Isobe permanently moved to Brazil and became the head of Kyokushin in South America.

After Masutatsu Oyama's death, Seiji Isobe remained in the Kyokushin faction led by Shokei Matsui (IKO1/Kyokushin Matsui Group) and to this is the General Manager of the organization in South America.

In November 1999, his disciple Francisco Filho, who participated in the 7th Open Tournament World Open Karate Championship (IKO1), became the first non-Japanese Kyokushin World Champion.

In July 2014, in commemoration of the 40th anniversary of the Brazilian branch, 12 world-class teams from 25 countries participated and held the ""Brazil Kyokushin 40th Anniversary World Cup Championship" in Sao Paulo. In addition, October 10, when Isobe took the first step to the land of Brazil in 1972, was designated as "Kyokushin Day" by the São Paulo City Council.

In 2018, he received the Honorary Citizenship of São Paulo.

Books

Notes

References

1948 births
Karate coaches
Kyokushin kaikan practitioners
Japanese sports executives and administrators
Living people